Bostan Rud Sharaf (also Romanized as Bostān Rūd Sharaf; also known as Bostān Rūd, Sharaf, and Bostān Rūd-e Soflá) is a village in Shurab Rural District, Veysian District, Dowreh County, Lorestan Province, Iran. At the 2006 census, its population was 198, in 46 families.

References 

Towns and villages in Dowreh County